"Let's Call It a Day Girl" is a 1966 song which became a hit for Florida-based pop rock group The Razor's Edge.  The song was written by Irwin Levine and Neil Sheppard.  Bobby Vee also recorded the song, with his rendition becoming a hit three years later.

Both Vee's version and The Razor's Edge's version charted in the United States and Canada, with The Razor's Edge having the larger hit in both nations (U.S. #77, Canada #57).  The B-side of Vee's record, "I'm Gonna Make It Up to You," also reached the charts (U.S. #132), however, both songs were non-album tracks and neither rendition appeared on an LP.

Other versions 
"Let's Call It a Day Girl" was also recorded by The Four Preps in 1966, also a non-album track.

Chart history 
The Razor's Edge

Bobby Vee

References

External links 
 Lyrics of this song
 

1966 songs
1966 singles
1969 singles
Bobby Vee songs
Songs written by Irwin Levine
Liberty Records singles
Song recordings produced by Snuff Garrett